David Alexander Villar (born January 27, 1997) is an American professional baseball third baseman for the San Francisco Giants of Major League Baseball (MLB). He played college baseball at the University of South Florida. He was drafted by the Giants in the 11th round of the 2018 Major League Baseball draft, and made his MLB debut with them in July 2022. He was awarded the 2022 Pacific Coast League Most Valuable Player Award.

Early life
Villar was born in Atlanta, Georgia, and grew up in Pembroke Pines, Florida. His parents are Lazaro and Mirta, and he has a sister, Natalie.

High school
Villar attended American Heritage High School in Plantation, Florida.  He played for the high school baseball team, starting in eighth grade, and batted .346 as a sophomore. As a junior, he batted .444 and was named First Team All-County by the Sun Sentinel and Miami Herald. As a senior and team captain, he was a Preseason Under Armour All-American, batted .324, and was again named First Team All-County by the Sun Sentinel and Miami Herald.

College
Villar played college baseball at the University of South Florida. In his sophomore year in 2017 he batted .290/.417(10th in the American Athletic Conference)/.449 with 7 home runs, 45 RBIs (9th), 41 walks (2nd), and 62 strikeouts (6th) in 214 at bats, playing third base. In the summer of 2017 he played for the La Crosse Loggers in the collegiate summer wood bat Northwoods League, and batted .312/.399/.546(10th in the league) with 13 home runs (2nd), 49 RBIs (9th), 14 hit by pitch (3rd), 5 sacrifice flies, and three intentional walks (leading the league), and 56 strikeouts (5th) in 231 at bats, playing 51 games at third base and five games at first base. 

Playing in 2018 as a junior for South Florida, Villar led the league with 24 doubles (9th-most in the country, and a Conference record) and 8 sacrifice flies. He also batted .374(2nd in the Conference)/.463(2nd)/.648(2nd)  with 53 runs (4th), 12 home runs (7th), 58 RBIs (2nd), and 15 hit by pitch (2nd) in 219 at bats, playing third base. He was named an All-American by Collegiate Baseball Newspaper and College Sports Madness, and 2018 All-American Athletic Conference First Team. 

Villar was drafted by the San Francisco Giants in the 11th round of the 2018 Major League Baseball draft. He signed for a signing bonus of $125,000.

Professional career

2018-21
Villar spent 2018, his first professional season, with the Rookie League Arizona League Giants and Class A- Salem-Keizer Volcanoes, batting a combined .282/.342/.535 in 245 at bats, playing third base. With Salem-Keizer, he was 3rd in doubles in the Northwest League with 22, 3rd in home runs with 13, 3rd in RBIs with 42, 6th in slugging percentage at .549, 8th in strikeouts (67), and 9th in runs with 36, in 226 at bats. He was named a 2018 MiLB Organization All Star. 

He played in 2019 with the Class A+ San Jose Giants, batting .262/.334/.421 with 68 runs (9th in the California League), 9 hit by pitch (9th), 144 strikeouts (5th), and 7 sacrifice flies (4th) in 423 at bats, playing 97 games at third base and 12 games at first base. Villar did not play in 2020, due to the minor league season being cancelled because of the Covid-19 pandemic.

Villar played for the Class AA Richmond Flying Squirrels in 2021. He batted .275/.374/.506 with 70 runs (3rd in the Northeast League), 29 doubles (4th), 20 home runs (7th; a single-season franchise record), 46 walks (5th), 112 strikeouts (6th), 15 hit by pitch (leading the league) in 385 at bats, playing 92 games at third base and 13 games at first base.  He was named a 2021 MiLB Organization All Star.

2022
Villar started 2022 with the Triple-A Sacramento River Cats. At the time of his July 4, 2022, callup, Villar was leading the Pacific Coast League with 21 home runs and batting .284/.409/.633(5th) with 53 runs (3rd), 63 RBIs (2nd), 44 walks (2nd), 76 strikeouts (2nd), and 6 hit by pitch (7th) in 229 at bats. 

On July 4, 2022, the Giants selected Villar's contract and promoted him to the major leagues. His first Major League hit came that day on the first pitch in his first at bat, a double in the second inning against Madison Bumgarner and the Arizona Diamondbacks.

In 2022 with Sacramento Villar batted .275/.404(7th in the league)/.617(4th) in 298 at bats, with 67 runs, 27 home runs (6th), 82 RBIs (tied for 8th), 55 walks, 93 strikeouts, and 11 hit by pitch (8th), while playing 51 games at third base, 16 games at first base, and 15 games at second base, and five at DH. After the season, he was chosen for the Pacific Coast League Most Valuable Player Award, and named third baseman on the post-season PCL All Star team.

With the Giants in 2022 he batted .231/.332/.455 in 156 at bats, with 9 home runs, 24 RBIs, and 58 strikeouts, while playing 27 games at third base, 11 at first base, 10 at DH, and 6 at second base.

References

External links

USF Bulls bio

1997 births
Living people
Baseball players from Atlanta
Major League Baseball third basemen
San Francisco Giants players
South Florida Bulls baseball players
Danbury Westerners players
Arizona League Giants players
Salem-Keizer Volcanoes players
San Jose Giants players
Richmond Flying Squirrels players
Sacramento River Cats players
La Crosse Loggers players